Jafar Mokhtarifar (born 7 September 1957) is a captain and former midfielder of Esteghlal and the Iranian national team. He is known as one of the best players in the history of Iranian football. He also played for Al Arabi.

International Records

Honours 

Asian Cup:
Fourth Place : 1984

References

External links

Team Melli Stats

Living people
Iranian footballers
Iranian expatriate footballers
Esteghlal F.C. players
Place of birth missing (living people)
Association football forwards
Iran international footballers
1957 births